VIA, the Way of the People (VIA) is a social conservative and Christian rightist party in France. The party was known as the Forum of Social Republicans (FRS) between 2001 and June 2009 before being adopting the name Christian Democratic Party (PCD), which it used until 3 October 2020. The party was founded by Christine Boutin. On 3 October 2020, the party would change its name to the current one.

The FRS was established in March 2001 as a social conservative faction within the liberal conservative Union for French Democracy (UDF) and emerged as an independent party in December of the same year, when Boutin announced her candidacy in the 2002 French presidential election, in contrast with UDF leader and official candidate François Bayrou, and was consequently expelled.

In 2005, the FRS called for a NO vote in the referendum over the Treaty establishing a Constitution for Europe.

VIA is a Christian-oriented social conservative party, opposed to gay marriage, abortion and euthanasia.

VIA was an associate party of the Union for a Popular Movement and was a member of the Liaison Committee for the Presidential Majority.

Since November 2013, Jean-Frédéric Poisson has been the president of the party.

Elected officials

Deputies: Dino Cinieri (UMP group)

The party also claims 9,500 members as of 2009.

References

External links
Official website

Political party factions in France
Factions and associate parties of the Union for a Popular Movement
Right-wing parties in France
European Christian Political Movement
Union for French Democracy breakaway groups